Murder on a Bridle Path is a 1936 mystery film directed by William Hamilton and Edward Killy, starring James Gleason and Helen Broderick. This film was the fourth production in the Hildegarde Withers series, and the only one in which Broderick played Hildegarde Withers.

Plot
An apparent accident involving a horse in Central Park leads a police inspector to join forces with a brash amateur detective (Hildegarde Withers, played by Helen Broderick) to solve a woman's death.

Cast 
 James Gleason as Police Inspector Oscar Piper
 Helen Broderick as Hildegarde Withers
 Sheila Terry as Violet Feverel
 Louise Latimer as Barbara Foley, Violet's sister
 Owen Davis Jr. as Eddie Fryi
 John Arledge as Joey Thomas
 John Carroll as Latigo Wells
 Leslie Fenton as Don Gregg
 Christian Rub as Chris Thomas
 Willie Best as High Pockets
 John Miltern as Pat Gregg
 Spencer Charters as Warden Sylvester Mahoney
 James Donlan as Detective Kane
 Gustav von Seyffertitz as Doctor Bloom
 Frank Reicher as Dr. Peters

References

External links 
 
 
 
 

1936 films
1930s comedy mystery films
American comedy mystery films
American black-and-white films
Films based on American novels
Films set in New York City
RKO Pictures films
Films with screenplays by Dorothy Yost
Films directed by Edward Killy
Films directed by William Hamilton (film editor)
Hildegarde Withers
1930s English-language films
1930s American films